Dokka Station was a railway station located in Dokka, Nordre Land, Norway, on the Valdres Line. The station opened on 28 November 1902 and remained until the line closed on 1 January 1989. It was 147.91 kilometers (91.91 mi) from Oslo Central Station and 148.5 meters (487 ft) above mean sea level. The restaurant was taken over by Norsk Spisevognselskap on 17 January 1922. However, the restaurant was closed on 1 October 1923.

References

Railway stations in Oppland
Railway stations on the Valdres Line
Railway stations opened in 1902
Railway stations closed in 1989
1902 establishments in Norway
Nordre Land